Robert Boyd (born in Whifflet Old Monkland on 2 July 1867, died in West Calder Midlothian on 11 August 1930) was a Scottish footballer who worked as a shale miner and played for Mossend Swifts, Leith Athletic, Third Lanark and Scotland. Bob Boyd played in 2 international matches in 1889 and 1891. He was the first player from the East of Scotland League to play for the Scottish National Team.

References

Sources

External links

London Hearts profile

1867 births
1930 deaths
Scottish footballers
Scotland international footballers
Leith Athletic F.C. players
Association football inside forwards
Mossend Swifts F.C. players